Barrmaelia is a genus of fungi in the family Xylariaceae. It was named after mycologist Margaret E. Barr.

References

External links
Index Fungorum

Xylariales